David Garcia is an American politician and education professor who was the Democratic Party's nominee in the 2018 Arizona gubernatorial election.

Garcia is an associate professor at Arizona State University's Mary Lou Fulton Teachers College. He was the 2014 Democratic candidate for Superintendent of Public Instruction, but was defeated by the Republican Party's nominee, Diane Douglas. Garcia challenged Republican Governor Doug Ducey in the November 2018 Arizona gubernatorial election, losing by 14%.

Early life and education 

Garcia, a fourth generation Mexican-American, was born and raised in Mesa, Arizona. He served as an infantryman in the United States Army. Garcia graduated from Arizona State University with a B.A. in communication in 1993. He also graduated from the University of Chicago with a M.A. in education research in 1997 and a Ph.D. in education research in 2002.

Career 

An education researcher, Garcia previously worked in the Arizona Department of Education and currently works as an associate professor at ASU's Mary Lou Fulton Teachers College. In 2014, Garcia ran unsuccessfully for state superintendent against Republican Diane Douglas.

Despite his loss to Douglas, who was considered a historically weak candidate, Garcia announced his plan to challenge incumbent Republican Governor Doug Ducey in April 2017. Garcia defeated state legislator Steve Farley in the August 2018 Democratic gubernatorial primary.

While Garcia's 2014 bid attracted independent and Republican support, his 2018 campaign was considered progressive. Garcia's 2018 bid focused on supporting Medicare for All, raising income taxes to spend more on education initiatives, and opposing a wall along Arizona's southern border with Mexico. He also supported a “top-to-bottom” overhaul of ICE. Garcia's candidacy for governor had been compared to the candidacies of Bernie Sanders and Alexandria Ocasio-Cortez. In 2021, the Arizona Daily Star described Garcia as "a weak candidate with a campaign beset by missteps, including what was interpreted as a call for open borders".

On Election Day, Garcia was defeated by Ducey, 56.0%-41.8%.

Personal life 
Garcia is married to Lori Higuera, a corporate attorney in the Phoenix area. They have two daughters.

References

External links 
 Garcia for Governor, campaign website

21st-century American politicians
Arizona State University faculty
Arizona Democrats
Candidates in the 2018 United States elections
Living people
1970 births
People from Mesa, Arizona
Arizona State University alumni
Politicians from Phoenix, Arizona
University of Chicago alumni